Mount Richard Bennett is a  peak located at co-ordinates  in the Premier Range of the Cariboo Mountains in the east-central interior of British Columbia, Canada.  The mountain is just north of the taller Mount Sir John Abbott and is often considered a continuation of that mountain.

The name honours the eleventh Prime Minister of Canada, Richard Bedford Bennett, who died in 1947. The mountain was officially renamed after Bennett in 1962.

External links
Canadian Mountain Encyclopedia listing for Mount Richard Bennett

Richard Bennett
Cariboo Mountains
Cariboo Land District